Alvin Eugene Mitchell (born October 18, 1943) is a former American football defensive back who played three seasons in the National Football League with the Cleveland Browns and Denver Broncos. He was drafted by the Cleveland Browns in the tenth round of the 1968 NFL Draft. He played college football at Morgan State University and attended Simon Gratz High School in Philadelphia, Pennsylvania.

References

External links
Just Sports Stats

Living people
1943 births
Players of American football from Philadelphia
American football defensive backs
African-American players of American football
Morgan State Bears football players
Cleveland Browns players
Denver Broncos players
21st-century African-American people
20th-century African-American sportspeople